This is a list of singles that charted in the top ten of the ARIA Charts in 2004.

Top-ten singles

Key

2003 peaks

2005 peaks

References 

Top 10 singles
Australia Top 10 singles
Top 10 singles 2004
Australia 2004